Oleksandr Yevhenovych Rybka (born 10 April 1987) is a Ukrainian professional footballer who plays as a goalkeeper for Lviv.

Career
He was a goalkeeper for the Ukrainian national under-21 football team along with Bohdan Shust becoming the vice-champion at the 2006 UEFA European Under-21 Football Championship.

In the 2007–2008 season, due to injury, he made four appearances for FC Dynamo Kyiv conceding 3 goals. He then made his UEFA Champions League debut against Real Madrid C.F. in 2006/2007 season's group stage. Dynamo lost the game 5–1 in Madrid and Rybka made a memorable performance, even though he conceded a 5th and final goal of the match from a penalty kick.

In 2011, Rybka had signed for FC Shakhtar. In Shakhtar, he would put up some great performances, and would eventually become the starting goalkeeper. However, this momentum stopped. Rybka received a two-year ban after testing positive for a prohibited substance diuretic in a league game against Karpaty Lviv in November 2011 lasting until January 10, 2014, meaning he would miss the 2012 UEFA European Championship which were being co-hosted by Ukraine alongside Poland.

On 1 November 2013, Rybka re-signed for Dynamo Kyiv. The 3-year contract he signed began in January 2014, when his ban was terminated.

In March 2022, he moved on loan to Boluspor.

In January 2023 he moved to Lviv.

Honours 
Dynamo Kyiv
 Ukrainian Premier League: 2006–07, 2008–09, 2014–15, 2015–16
 Ukrainian Cup: 2005-06, 2006-07, 2013-14, 2014–15

Liepāja
 Latvian Football Cup: 2020

Shakhtar Donetsk
 Ukrainian Premier League: 2011-12
 Ukrainian Cup: 2011-12

References

External links
 Profile on Dynamo Kyiv website 
 
 

1987 births
Living people
Ukrainian footballers
Association football goalkeepers
Ukraine youth international footballers
Ukraine under-21 international footballers
Ukrainian Premier League players
Ukrainian First League players
Ukrainian Second League players
FC Obolon-Brovar Kyiv players
FC Dynamo Kyiv players
FC Dynamo-2 Kyiv players
FC Dynamo-3 Kyiv players
FC Shakhtar Donetsk players
Ukrainian sportspeople in doping cases
Doping cases in association football
Footballers from Kyiv
Ukrainian expatriate footballers
Ukraine international footballers
Kardemir Karabükspor footballers
Expatriate footballers in Turkey
Ukrainian expatriate sportspeople in Turkey
Expatriate footballers in Azerbaijan
Ukrainian expatriate sportspeople in Azerbaijan
Azerbaijan Premier League players
Latvian Higher League players
Sabail FK players
FK Liepāja players
Expatriate footballers in Latvia
Ukrainian expatriate sportspeople in Latvia
FC Metalist Kharkiv players